For the restaurant in Providence, Rhode Island, see Al Forno

Al forno (literally "on fire", meaning "baked") is food that has been baked in an oven. Italian dishes commonly prepared in this way include pizza, breads and pasta dishes, notably lasagna.

Pasta is sometimes boiled before it is baked in al forno dishes. This double cooking means that it is served soft, not with the firm al dente consistency that some Italians prefer in pasta dishes.

History and culture

Southern Italy has a tradition of wood-burning ovens and open-flame grills. A wood-fired oven and al forno dishes are a feature of many Italian restaurants. Brick and clay ovens are a key feature of cuisines of the Mediterranean and Middle East, with wood being the main fuel for many parts of Europe for many centuries. A typical oven found in Italian restaurants is brick lined with an arched oven door, and a wooden board with a very long handle is used to place the food to be cooked in the centre of the oven.

See also

 List of baked goods

References

External links

Italian cuisine
Cooking
Pasta
Baked foods